Horna/Behexen is a split EP by the black metal bands Horna and Behexen. It was first released in 2004 on vinyl by Grievantee Productions and was limited to 500 copies. The CD version was released by Autistiartili Records and was limited to 1000 copies on. It was later re-released on February 5, 2007 through Debemur Morti Productions with different artwork.

Track listing

Personnel

Behexen
 Torog – vocals
 Gargantum – guitars
 Horns – drums

Horna
 Corvus – vocals
 Shatraug – guitar, vocals
 Mynni Luukkainen – bass guitar
 Gorthaur – drums

Additional personnel
 Christophe Szpajdel – Behexen and Horna logos

Footnotes

External links
Official Horna site – Discography

Behexen albums
Horna EPs
2004 EPs
Split EPs